Talat Khwan may refer to:

Talat Khwan, a former name of the city of Nonthaburi in Thailand
Talat Khwan, a former name of Mueang Nonthaburi District, Nonthaburi Province
Talat Khwan, Nonthaburi, a subdistrict (tambon) of Mueang Nonthaburi District
Talat Khwan, Chiang Mai, a subdistrict (tambon) of Doi Saket District, Chiang Mai Province